Everybody's Rockin is the 13th studio album by Canadian / American musician Neil Young, released on August 1, 1983. The album was recorded with the Shocking Pinks (a band made up just for the occasion), and features a selection of rockabilly songs (both covers and original material). Running 25 minutes, it is Young's shortest album. Everybody's Rockin is typical of his 1980s period in that it bears little or no resemblance to the album released before it (Trans (1983), a synth-heavy, electro-rock album), nor the one released after it (Old Ways (1985), which is pure country).

Background
Having already created tension with his label, Geffen Records, with the previous year's Trans, in 1983 Young offered the label a country album he had recorded the previous fall called Old Ways. Young's music had previously shown the influence of country music, including his most successful album, Harvest (1972). Geffen, however, reeling from the commercial and critical failure of Trans, rejected Old Ways and demanded "a rock & roll album".

Young went into the studio and quickly produced an album with a sound reminiscent of the early period of rock & roll, including Jimmy Reed's "Bright Lights, Big City" and "Mystery Train," recorded by Elvis Presley in his early days at Sun Records. The production included '50s-style vocal reverb and backing choruses. Most songs were Young originals, such as "Kinda Fonda Wanda" that had originally been written to amuse his wife. Young wrote the song "Wonderin" long before the sessions for Everybody's Rockin. It dates from at least the After the Gold Rush era, and was part of his setlist at solo acoustic shows in 1970, as well as at Woodstock with Crosby, Stills, Nash, and Young in 1969.

"Wonderin'" and "Cry, Cry, Cry" were released as singles and both featured accompanying music videos, but MTV gave them little airtime. Like with Trans, Young conducted a supporting tour for Everybody's Rockin and played material from the album live despite the poor reception and low attendance at his concerts.

According to Young, Everybody's Rockin had been intended to be a concept album, with two additional songs, "Get Gone" and "Don't Take Your Love Away From Me," that would have "given a lot more depth to The Shocking Pinks." However, an infuriated Geffen Records cancelled the recording sessions, preventing Young from finishing the album, and released it as it was. The two songs later appeared on Young's compilation Lucky Thirteen.

Young explained the inspiration for the album in 1995, saying that "there was very little depth to the material obviously. They were all 'surface' songs. But see, there was a time when music was like that, when all pop stars were like that. And it was good music, really good music. Plus it was a way of further destroying what I'd already set up. Without doing that, I wouldn't be able to do what I'm doing now. If I build something up, I have to systematically tear it right down before people decide, 'Oh that's how we can define him." He also said of his rockabilly persona, "I was that guy for a year and a half, almost like being in a movie."

Reception

At the time of its release, Everybody's Rockin''' received among the worst critical reviews of Young's career. Robert Christgau of the Village Voice wrote that "The covers are redundant or worse, as are all but two of the originals....I hope Neil realizes that for all the horrible truth of 'Payola Blues,' nobody's three thou's gonna get this on top forty." New Musical Express added: "At least Neil Young has yet resisted rejoining Crosby, Stills and Nash, although this foray into rockabilly pastiche is hardly much less regressive than that."

Young himself expressed fondness for the album, comparing it favorably to his acclaimed 1975 album Tonight's the Night, yet also acknowledging the truth of some of its harsher criticisms: "What am I? Stupid? Did people really think I put that out thinking it was the greatest fuckin' thing I'd ever recorded? Obviously I'm aware it's not."Everybody's Rockin was included in Q magazine's 2006 list of the 50 worst albums ever made.

Lawsuit
In November 1983, following the commercial failure of Everybody's Rockin'', Geffen sued Young for $3.3 million, on the grounds that this record and its predecessor were "not commercial", and "musically uncharacteristic of [his] previous recordings." Young filed a $21 million countersuit, alleging breach of contract since Young had been promised no creative interference from the label.

The suit backfired against Geffen, with label owner David Geffen personally apologizing to Young for the suit and for interference with his work.

The year before the lawsuit, just after Young had signed to Geffen, his longtime manager Elliot Roberts was asked why Young had changed labels, and said, "I did have a much larger offer from RCA, about $4 million more. David Geffen and I used to be partners and David has worked with Neil for a very long time. He totally relates to Neil as an artist and has no preconceived notions about Neil. He knows that he's capable of doing anything at any point, at any time... He will have the freedom to practice his art as he sees it, as opposed to when you make a deal where someone is paying you $1-2 million an album you feel obligated to give them commercial music that they can sell large numbers of. Neil's not concerned with selling large numbers of his records, he's concerned with making records that he's pleased with. Unfortunately they are not always commercial from the record company's point of view. David Geffen relates to that. He knows Neil may do a country album and then he may do an electric album because there's no rhyme or reason with Neil. It's what he's moved by."

Track listing
All songs written and composed by Neil Young, except where noted.

Personnel
Neil Young – vocals, piano, guitar, harmonica
The Shocking Pinks
Larry Byrom – piano, backing vocals
Anthony Crawford – backing vocals
Tim Drummond – upright bass
Karl Himmel – snare drum
Ben Keith – alto saxophone, lead guitar
Rick Palombi – backing vocals

References

External links
Lyrics at HyperRust.org

1983 albums
Albums produced by Elliot Mazer
Albums produced by Neil Young
Covers albums
Geffen Records albums
Neil Young albums
Rockabilly albums